Clark Canyon Dam is an earthfill dam located in Beaverhead County, Montana, about  south of the county seat of Dillon. The dam impounds the waters of the Beaverhead River, creating a body of water known as Clark Canyon Reservoir. The structure was constructed in 1961-1964 by the United States Bureau of Reclamation, to hold water for downstream irrigation and for flood control purposes.

The dam contains 1,970,000 cubic yards (1,510,000 m³) of material.

Construction of the dam and reservoir required the relocation of U.S. Route 91 (rebuilt as Interstate 15) and a main line of the Union Pacific Railroad. The reservoir inundated the former site of the small community of Armstead, Montana, and the site of Camp Fortunate, where the Lewis and Clark Expedition camped from August 17 to 22, 1805 and held negotiations with the Shoshone.

Fishing 
Fishing is a popular activity on the reservoir created by the dam. The reservoir is regularly stocked with fish.

References

External links
Bureau of Reclamation: Clark Canyon Information

Buildings and structures in Beaverhead County, Montana
Dams in Montana
United States Bureau of Reclamation dams
Dams completed in 1964
Earth-filled dams
1964 establishments in Montana